The Hawaii Emergency Management Agency (HI-EMA) is the body responsible for managing emergencies in the United States State of Hawaii.

The director is major general Kenneth S. Hara and the administrator is Luke Meyers.

On January 13, 2018, the Agency received worldwide attention when one of its employees accidentally broadcast a ballistic missile alert to all the citizens of Hawaii, which, at the height of American nuclear tensions with North Korea, caused a statewide panic.

References

External links
Frequently Asked Questions about Ballistic Missile Preparedness.

State agencies of Hawaii
Emergency management in the United States